Mohammed Irfan is an Indian playback singer who sings predominantly in Hindi. He has also sung in Tamil, Kannada, Odia, Telugu, Bengali and Marathi.

Life and career

Early life 
Irfan was born in Hyderabad and completed his schooling at All Saints High School, Hyderabad. His teacher Ramachari identified Irfan's talent and trained him in music. He used to come back after completing his school to perform in annual events. He won the title of Jo Jeeta Wohi Super Star 2. He was also one of the contestants of Amul STAR Voice of India, as well as Sa Re Ga Ma Pa Challenge 2005, where he was on Ismail Darbar's Yalgaar Ho Gharana.

Bollywood career 
Irfan caught the attention of veteran singer S. P. Balasubrahmanyam during a concert at a musical institute in Hyderabad. Balasubramaniam recommended him to A.R. Rahman, after which Rahman asked Irfan to provide background vocals for the Mani Ratnam-directed 2010 film Raavan. Irfan recorded the song "Behene De" for the film alongside Karthik. The track, which topped music charts for many continuous weeks, also received rave critical reviews. The same year, he recorded two songs for Mithoon's Lamhaa, titled "Salaam Zindagi" and "Rehmat Zara", where for the latter he received the best male singer debut award.

Irfan performed "Phir Mohabbat" along with Arijit Singh and Saim Bhat in the Mukesh Bhatt-produced 2011 film Murder 2. The song was commercially successful and received radio airplay. He collaborated with the music directors Sajid–Wajid, Himesh Reshammiya, Meet Bros Anjjan, Jeet Ganguly.

His song ‘Dil Sambhal Ja Zara’ in film ‘Murder 2’ that made him establish himself as a singer.

In 2014 his songs included "Baarish" from Yaariyan, "Muskurane" from Citylights, "Banjaara" from Ek Villain, "Dard Dilo Ke" from The Xpose and "Tu Hi Tu" from Kick. The song "Banjaara", composed and written by Mithoon Sharma, was commercially successful. Reviewing the song, Rediff.com wrote Irfan "is another singer making an impression in the Bollywood musical arena, and is sure to be noticed with this number".

Discography

Hindi songs

Other languages

Accolades

References

External links

Official Facebook Page

Indian male playback singers
Singers from Hyderabad, India
1984 births
Living people
Bollywood playback singers
Singers from Karnataka
People from Udupi district
Film musicians from Karnataka
21st-century Indian singers
21st-century Indian male singers
Alumni of All Saints High School, Hyderabad